Eliachna is a genus of moths belonging to the family Tortricidae.

Species
Eliachna chileana Razowski, 1999
Eliachna digitana Brown & McPherson, 2002
Eliachna hemicordata Brown & McPherson, 2002

References

 , 1999, Polskie Pismo Ent. 68: 68
 , 2005, World Catalogue of Insects 5

External links
tortricidae.com

Euliini
Tortricidae genera
Taxa named by Józef Razowski